Ancient accounts of Homer include numerous passages in which archaic and classical Greek poets and prose authors mention or allude to Homer. In addition, they include the ten biographies of Homer, often referred to as Lives.

Dating of Homer
Dating Homer's life poses a challenge as there are no known records of his life other than his writings of the Odyssey and the Iliad. All accounts are based on tradition. The only explicit periodization hinted in written records comes from Herodotus, who maintains that Hesiod and Homer lived no more than 400 years before his own time, therefore around 850 BC. Artemon of Clazomenae, an annalist, gives Arctinus of Miletus, a pupil of Homer, a birth date of 744 BC. It is often assumed that he lived between 750 and 700 BC.

The lives and the epigrams

There are ten extant lives of Homer. Eight of these are edited in Georg Westermann's Vitarum Scriptores Graeci minores, including a narrative entitled the Contest of Homer and Hesiod. The longest, Life of Homer, is written in the Ionic dialect and claims to be the work of Herodotus, but is certainly spurious (see Pseudo-Herodotus). It most likely belongs to the 2nd century AD, although the other lives are more recent in origin.

The lives preserve short poems and fragments of verse attributed to Homer, the Epigrams, which used to be printed at the end of editions of Homer. They are numbered as they appear in Pseudo-Herodotus. These are easily recognized as popular rhymes, a form of folklore to be met with in most countries, treasured by the people as a kind of proverb.

In the Homeric epigrams, the subject matter often covers the characteristics of particular localities, for example, Smyrna and Cyme, Erythrae, and Mount Ida; others relate to certain trades or occupations: potters, sailors, fishermen, goat herds, etc., suggesting that they are not the work of any one poet. The fact that they were all ascribed to Homer suggests that they belong to a period in the history of the Ionian and Aeolian colonies when Homer was a name which drew to itself all ancient and popular verse.

The epigrams were the chief source from which the Lives of Homer were derived. Epigram 4 mentions a blind poet, a native of Aeolian Smyrna, through which flows the water of the sacred Meles. Here is doubtless the source of the chief incident of the Herodotean Life, the birth of Homer, named Son of the Meles to conceal a scandalous affair between his mother and an older man who had been appointed her guardian. The epithet Aeolian implies high antiquity, inasmuch as according to Herodotus, Smyrna became Ionian not too long before 688 BC. Naturally the Ionians had their own version of the story, a version which made Homer come out with the first Athenian colonists.

The minor poems
The same line of argument may be extended to the Hymns and works of the so-called Cyclic poets, the lost early epics, some of which formed the Epic Cycle and Theban Cycle. Thus:

The hymn to the Delian Apollo ends with an address of the poet to his audience. When any stranger comes and asks who the sweetest singer is, they are to answer with one voice, "the blind man that dwells in rocky Chios; his songs deserve the prize for all time to come." Thucydides, who quotes this passage to show the ancient character of the Delian festival, seems to have no doubt about the Homeric authorship of the hymn. Many accounts say that he was from Smyrna and lived in Chios later in his life.
The Margites, a humorous poem known as a reputed work of Homer down to the time of Aristotle, began with the words, "There came to Colophon an old man, a divine singer, servant of the Muses and Apollo." Hence the claim of Colophon to be the native city of Homer, a claim supported in the early times of Homeric learning by the Colophonian poet and grammarian Antimachus. The Suda reports Homer being a Smyrnaean that was taken as captive to the Colophonians in a war, hence the name Ὅμηρος, which in Greek means "captive". Homer's name originating from him being a captive is widely reported.
The poem called the Cypria was said to have been given by Homer to his son-in-law Stasinus of Cyprus as dowry. The connection with Cyprus appears further in the predominance given in the poem to Aphrodite.
The Little Iliad and the Phocais, according to the pseudo-Herodotean life, were composed by Homer when he lived at Phocaea with a certain Thestorides, who carried them off to Chios and there gained fame by reciting them as his own. The name Thestorides occurs in Epigram 5.
A similar story was told about the poem called the Capture of Oechalia, the subject of which was one of the exploits of Heracles. It passed under the name of Creophylus of Samos, a friend or (as some said) a son-in-law of Homer, and was sometimes said to have been given to Creophylus by Homer in return for hospitality.
The Thebaid was confidently counted as the work of Homer. As to the Epigoni, which carried on the Theban story, there was less certainty.

These indications render it probable that the stories connecting Homer with different cities and islands grew up after his poems had become known and famous, especially in the new and flourishing colonies of Aeolis and Ionia. The contention for Homer, began at a time when his real history was lost, and he had become a sort of mythical figure, an anonymous hero, or personification of a great school of poetry.

Arctinus of Miletus

A confirmation of this view from the negative side is furnished by the chief city among the Asiatic colonies of Greece, Miletus. No legend claims for Miletus even a visit from Homer or a share in the authorship of any Homeric poem. Yet, Arctinus of Miletus was said to have been a disciple of Homer and was certainly one of the earliest and most considerable of the Cyclic poets. His Aethiopis was composed as a sequel to the Iliad and the structure and general character of his poems show that he took the Iliad as his model. Yet, in his case, there is no indication of disputed authorship which is the case with other Cyclic poems. The most obvious account of the matter is that Arctinus was never so far forgotten that his poems became the subject of dispute.

See also
 Homeridae
 Life of Homer (Pseudo-Herodotus)

Notes

Homeric scholarship
Biographies of Homer